Epina dichromella is a moth in the family Crambidae. It was described by Francis Walker in 1866. It is found in Cuba and the eastern United States, where it has been recorded from Florida, Maryland, North Carolina and South Carolina.

References

Chiloini
Moths described in 1866